Anne-Élisabeth Bossé is a Canadian actress from Repentigny, Quebec. She garnered a Genie Award nomination as Best Supporting Actress at the 31st Genie Awards for her performance in Heartbeats (Les Amours imaginaires).

She has also appeared in the television series Série noire and Les Pays d'en haut, and the films Laurence Anyways, Felix and Meira, 9 (9, le film), An Extraordinary Person (Quelqu'un d'extraordinaire), The Passion of Augustine (La passion d'Augustine), Brain Freeze and A Revision (Une révision).

References

External links

1984 births
Canadian television actresses
Canadian film actresses
Actresses from Quebec
French Quebecers
Living people
People from Repentigny, Quebec